Karen Davis may refer to:
Karen Davis (activist) (born 1944), American animal-rights activist
Karen Davis (neuroscientist), neuroscientist at University of Toronto, Canada
Karen Davis (economist) (born 1942), president of The Commonwealth Fund
Karen Davis (politician), former mayor of Glendora, California
Karen Davis (The Grudge), a fictional character from The Grudge film series

See also
Karen Davies (born 1965), golfer from Wales